Press On is the second album by the CCM band Selah. It was released on June 12, 2001 by Curb Records.

Critical reception

Ashleigh Kittle of AllMusic writes, "Composed of brother and sister Todd and Nicol Smith plus friend Allan Hall, the Curb recording artists offer moving vocal arrangements and harmonies, which include Nicol Smith's deep, rich voice, reminiscent of Ashley Cleveland."

Paddy Hudspith reviews the album for Cross Rhythms and gives it 8 out of a possible 10 and remarks, "I was most impressed by the variety on offer here, from acapella or sparse string arrangements, to mature pop and even a touch of bluesy rock! Selah's three singers have more distinctive tones than some vocal groups on the CCM scene. Recommended."

Track listing

Charts

References

2001 albums
Curb Records albums
Selah (band) albums